Emily Michele Coody Marks (born March 6, 1973) is the Chief United States district judge of the United States District Court for the Middle District of Alabama.

Biography 

Marks was born on March 6, 1973, in Tuscaloosa, Alabama. She earned her Bachelor of Arts, magna cum laude, from Spring Hill College, and her Juris Doctor from the University of Alabama School of Law, where she served as chair of the John A. Campbell Moot Court Board and as a senior editor of the University of Alabama Law & Psychology Review.

Marks was a partner in the Montgomery, Alabama, office of Ball, Ball, Matthews & Novak, P.A., where she practiced from 1998, when she joined the firm as an associate, to 2018, when she became a judge. She specialized in labor and employment law, civil rights law, and appellate practice, and routinely lectured on these topics before employers and other members of the bar.

Federal judicial service 

On September 7, 2017, President Donald Trump nominated Marks to serve as a United States District Judge of the United States District Court for the Middle District of Alabama, to the seat vacated by Judge Myron Herbert Thompson, who assumed senior status on August 22, 2013. On October 17, 2017, a hearing on her nomination was held before the Senate Judiciary Committee. On November 9, 2017, her nomination was reported out of committee by voice vote.

On January 3, 2018, her nomination was returned to the President under Rule XXXI, Paragraph 6 of the United States Senate. On January 5, 2018, President Donald Trump announced his intent to renominate Marks to a federal judgeship. On January 8, 2018, her renomination was sent to the Senate. On January 18, 2018, her nomination was reported out of committee by a 17–4 vote. On August 1, 2018, her nomination was confirmed by voice vote. She received her judicial commission on August 3, 2018. She became Chief Judge on January 31, 2019, after William Keith Watkins assumed senior status.

In September 2021, The Wall Street Journal published an investigation into 131 federal judges who were alleged to have broken the law by presiding over cases in which they had a financial interest. In August 2018, Marks purchased stock in Wells Fargo Bank two weeks after she was assigned a case in which plaintiff-homeowners sued Wells Fargo for wrongful foreclosure on their home. She did not disclose her stock purchases. Marks subsequently dismissed the lawsuit against Wells Fargo on a pre-trial motion.

In October 2022, Marks invoked qualified immunity to deny the family of a cancer patient the right to sue the policeman who killed him. The patient had acted aggressive and erratic after brain surgery. The family called the police for help. A neighbor, also a policeman, intervened and fired six shots, hitting the unarmed victim five times.

Memberships 

She has been a member of the Federalist Society since 2017.

References

External links 
 

|-

1973 births
Living people
20th-century American lawyers
21st-century American lawyers
21st-century American judges
Alabama lawyers
Federalist Society members
Judges of the United States District Court for the Middle District of Alabama
People from Tuscaloosa, Alabama
Spring Hill College alumni
United States district court judges appointed by Donald Trump
University of Alabama School of Law alumni
20th-century American women lawyers
21st-century American women lawyers
21st-century American women judges